Commodore Anthony John Marsden Hogg, AFC, was the Devon and Cornwall Police and Crime Commissioner (PCC), representing the Conservative Party. He was the first person to hold the post and was elected on 15 November 2012.

Early life
He was educated at Cheltenham College.

Career

Military service
Hogg joined the Royal Navy after completing his A-levels. He received his officer training at Britannia Royal Naval College in Dartmouth, Devon. His commission was confirmed on 1 September 1972 and he was granted the rank of sub lieutenant with seniority from 1 September 1970. He was promoted to lieutenant on 16 September 1973. Hogg's subsequent career involved a mix of helicopter and ship command postings and work in the Ministry of Defence including the role of appointer for the Fleet Air Arm and Director Naval Operations, aviation.

Subsequent career
Hogg joined Westland Helicopters, later AgustaWestland, in 2000 immediately after leaving the Royal Navy. His role was as one of three Defence Advisers advising the Westand Board in interaction with a primary customer the Royal Navy and wider Ministry Of Defence.

In 2007, Hogg returned to Cornwall to take up the position as Chief Executive of a local charity in Cornwall: BF Adventure, which employed outdoor adventure to build confidence, life skills and improved behaviour in some of Cornwall's disadvantaged young people. He left that post in 2011.

Police and crime commissioner 
Hogg was elected as PCC on 15 November 2012. He resigned from the Conservative Party in April 2016 in protest at the lack of government publicity given to the second round of elections for the post. He was succeeded by Alison Hernandez on 6 May 2016.

Personal life
Hogg is married to Chrissie. Together they have two children: Simon and Max. They live in Helston, Cornwall.

Honours and decorations

An Air Force Cross was awarded for the rescue of crew from the Grimsby trawler Ben Asdale. Hogg was the primary pilot of a Royal Navy Sea King rescue helicopter of 706 Naval Air Squadron on the night of 30 December 1978.

References

Police and crime commissioners in England
Living people
Year of birth missing (living people)
Recipients of the Air Force Cross (United Kingdom)
Graduates of Britannia Royal Naval College
Royal Navy officers
Politicians from Cornwall
People educated at Cheltenham College
Conservative Party police and crime commissioners